PocketWatch, Inc. (stylized as pocket.watch) is a digital media studio that specializes in extending kids and family YouTube stars and characters into global franchises. With offices and a studio located in Culver City, Los Angeles, California, the company was founded in 2017 by Chris M. Williams. A funding led by Third Wave Digital with participation from additional investors and prominent angels including Jon Landau, UTA Ventures, the venture arm of United Talent Agency (UTA), Robert Downey Jr. (Downey Ventures) and Chris Jacquemin (Partner, Head of Digital Media, WME).

History 

As the entertainment industry shifts into the digital space, PocketWatch has evolved out of the Social media influencer movement. PocketWatch was at the forefront of specifically targeting Generation Alpha (individuals born after 2010) who are migrating towards digital media platforms like YouTube. Allen DeBevoise of Third Wave Digital has described PocketWatch as the company to "transform the kids’ digital entertainment space". Founded by Chris M. Williams, the former Chief Audience Officer of Maker Studios and former GM of Disney Online Originals.

Variety recognized Williams as one of their Digital Innovators in 2019 and he was a finalist in the 2019 Ernst & Young Entrepreneur of the Year competition. PocketWatch has expanded their executive team with veterans from kids and family entertainment and other relevant industries adding Albie Hecht, the former head of Nickelodeon Studios as Chief Content Officer, Kerry Tucker, the former CEO of Hello Sunshine and lead marketing executive at Martha Stewart Living and Victoria's Secret, as Chief Marketing Officer, as well as Hollywood veterans Brian Robbins, President of Kids and Family entertainment at ViacomCBS, and Beatriz Acevedo, founder of online video network Mitu as Board Members for the company.

2017 
In April 2017, PocketWatch signed HobbyKidsTV as their first creator partner. HobbyKids specializes in toy play, outdoor activities and other family-oriented content across 10 YouTube channels that have generated 7.5 billion views.

In August 2017, PocketWatch teamed up with Viacom and SNL star, Kenan Thompson to develop a live-action scripted comedy show for kids Skoogle. Later that year, pocket.watch partnered with the creator of The Fairly OddParents, Butch Hartman, to develop three original animated series, including one based on HobbyKidsTV.

In August 2017, PocketWatch signed Captain Sparklez, a video-game and entertainment channel created and run by Jordan Maron, a YouTube personality.

In September 2017, the studio signed a long-term partnership with Ryan ToysReview. Ryan ToysReview is the most-viewed kids and family creator channel on YouTube in the United States and, according to Forbes magazine, was YouTube's highest-earning influencer in 2018, estimated to have earned $22 million.

In September 2017, PocketWatch signed EvanTubeHD and his family, primarily focused on the brother-sister combination of Evan and Jillian, the stars of the channel. Their videos have evolved since originally launching as a toy channel and one of the best-known examples of the unboxing trend, in which kids open up new toys on camera. Now the channel primarily consists of challenges, gameplay and other formats that feature the comradery and rivalry between Evan and Jillian. Their parents also frequently appear in videos as well.

Since its launch, PocketWatch has continued to expand its reach beyond YouTube into publishing, television, film, and consumer goods. In November 2017, PocketWatch partnered with Simon & Schuster to publish children's books under a PocketWatch branded imprint and launched their first two books, Watch this Book! and Meet Ryan! in the winter of 2018.

2018 
In February 2018, PocketWatch collaborated with Ryan ToysReview to create Ryan's World, a consumer products brand based on Ryan and a portfolio of characters created by Ryan and his parents. The first consumer products licensees for Ryan's World were The Bentex Group and Bonkers Toys. PocketWatch has also secured international licensing deals with licensing agencies and media companies in the U.K., Australia, and other countries expanding the line globally.

In August 2018, Ryan's World, launched exclusively at Walmart. The line included a giant golden mystery egg that sold out in 10 minutes on Black Friday 2018.

In October 2018, PocketWatch launched 90 22-minute episodes of repackaged content from their YouTube creator partners on Hulu and Amazon Prime Video and partnered with Paramount Pictures to license them to international distributors.

2019 
PocketWatch unveiled 40 new licensing partnerships. The expansion of Ryan's World's licensing program was anchored by new licensees, including Just Play, Jada Toys, Kids Preferred, American Greetings, and Zak Designs and spanned new categories, including Halloween costumes, party goods, social expressions, sleepwear, backpacks, lunch kits and accessories, hydration, furniture, and home goods.

In January 2019, PocketWatch launched its gaming division P.W Games with their first mobile game in partnership with WildWorks, Tag With Ryan, a free-to-play, endless runner game featuring the likeness of Ryan and the many characters of Ryan's World. The game has been downloaded more than 5 million times since launching.

PocketWatch created, produced and launched their first television series Ryan's Mystery Playdate, a live-action show for preschoolers on Nickelodeon April 19, 2019. Ryan's Mystery Playdate launched to successful ratings and was renewed for a second season five days after the premiere on April 24. It has since become the number one series on television for preschoolers in the U.S.

In May 2019, PocketWatch signed deals with YouTube channels MarMar and Onyx Family to launch new programming.

In June 2019, PocketWatch launched HobbyKids Adventures, an original animated series created by Butch Hartman and based on their creator partners HobbyKidsTV, on YouTube.

In June 2019, PocketWatch partnered with Hardee's, as they relaunched their Star Pals kids meals after an eight-year hiatus with Ryan's World themed meals and an exclusive line of toys designed by Ryan ToysReview.

In July 2019, PocketWatch, under their P.W Games division, and Outright Games announced a partnership to release Race With Ryan the first ever console game to be released as part of Ryan's World, on PlayStation 4, Nintendo Switch, Xbox One and PC in November 2019.

2020 
In February 2020, PocketWatch launched their advertising agency Clock.work, focused on child-targeted advertising across YouTube, mobile gaming and OTT channels.

2021 
In 2021, PocketWatch announced a literacy curriculum series for PBS Kids starring YouTube star Unspeakable.

Revenue 
In July 2018, Viacom raised $15 million in Series B for PocketWatch.

Creative partners 
 Ryan's World
 HobbyFamilyTV
 EvanTubeHD
 JillianTubeHD
 CaptainSparklez
 MarMar
 The Onyx Family
 Jason Vlogs
 Kids Diana Show
 Lilly Singh
 KidCity

References

External links 

Companies based in Culver City, California
American companies established in 2017
Talent agencies